Gloxinia can refer to:
Gloxinia (genus), flowering plants in the family Gesneriaceae
Sinningia speciosa, a plant species formerly classified in the genus Gloxinia and still commonly known by that name, in the family Gesneriaceae
Creeping gloxinia (Lophospermum erubescens), in the family Plantaginaceae, formerly in Scrophulariaceae
Hardy gloxinia (Incarvillea delavayi), in the family Bignoniaceae